Yury Kasakov (also transliterated Yuri Kazakov; born 30 November 1937) is a Soviet diver. He competed in the men's 3 metre springboard event at the 1956 Summer Olympics.

References

External links
 

1937 births
Living people
Soviet male divers
Olympic divers of the Soviet Union
Divers at the 1956 Summer Olympics
Place of birth missing (living people)